Alpine County is a county in the eastern part of the U.S. state of California located within the Sierra Nevada on the state border with Nevada. As of the 2020 Census, the population was 1,204, making it California's least populous county. The county seat and largest community is Markleeville.

History

The Washoe people, a Great Basin tribe, inhabited the Sierra Nevada on the California–Nevada boundary, with the Hung A Lel Ti band populating the Diamond Valley including what would become Alpine County.

Kit Carson and John C. Frémont were among the first explorers to bring nationwide attention to the Sierra Nevada region in their winter 1844 expedition, though the first known westerners to actually explore the area were Jedediah Smith and Joseph R. Walker. Though gold spurred the infrastructural development of Alpine County, the Comstock Lode found near Virginia City, Nevada and the subsequent silver boom was what triggered Alpine County's growth, even attracting gold miners from neighboring Nevada. This prompted the formation on March 16, 1864, from parts of Amador County, Calaveras County, El Dorado County, Mono County and Tuolumne County. It was named Alpine County due to its resemblance to the Swiss Alps. At its formation, it had a population numbering around 11,000. By 1868, however, the local silver mines had proven unfruitful of replicating the Nevada silver boom and the population fell to about 685 in the 1870 Census, a decline that would steadily continue through the 1950s. Silver Mountain (established as Köngsberg) was designated the county seat following the discovery of silver nearby by Norwegian miners. Markleeville, established by Jacob Markley in 1861 as a 160-acre claim encompassing a bridge and toll station, became the new county seat in 1875. The collapse of the silver industry and closing of mines was finalized with the demonetization of silver in 1873, and Silver Mountain was abandoned by 1886, with most businesses moving to Markleeville.

Following the devastating collapse of the silver industry, the population began quickly declining until the 1950s, falling to an all-time low of 241 in 1930. During this time, its small economy limited the county to serving primarily as a trading center for the local farming and lumber industries, as well as fishing and hunting during the 1930s. Several lots in the county were left vacant.

Alpine County finally managed an economic rebound with the construction of the Bear Valley and Kirkwood ski resorts in the late 1960s, the latter of which is split with Amador County. The population shot up from 484 in 1970 to 1,097 in 1980, a 126.65% increase, and has remained around that level. The three national forests (Eldorado, Humboldt–Toiyabe and Stanislaus) means 96% of the county is owned by the federal government, providing opportunities for economic development and tourism to the skiing resorts as well as historical tourism and outdoor recreation.

Geography
The federal government owns about 96% of Alpine County, the highest percentage in California, including three national forests: Eldorado (54,318 acres, or 7.81% of the 695,098-acre total), Stanislaus (119,805 acres, or 13.32% of the 899,427 acre-total) and Humboldt–Toiyabe (233,962 acres, or 3.72% of the 6,290,945 acre-total).

Adjacent counties
 El Dorado County – northwest
 Douglas County, Nevada – northeast
 Mono County – southeast
 Tuolumne County – south
 Calaveras County – southwest
 Amador County – west

National protected areas
 Eldorado National Forest (part)
 Stanislaus National Forest (part)
 Toiyabe National Forest (part)

Demographics

2020 census

Note: the US Census treats Hispanic/Latino as an ethnic category. This table excludes Latinos from the racial categories and assigns them to a separate category. Hispanics/Latinos can be of any race.

2019 American Community Survey estimates

2010 Census
The 2010 United States Census reported that Alpine County had a population of 1,175. The racial makeup of Alpine County was 881 (75.0%) White, 0 (0.0%) African American, 240 (20.4%) Native American, 7 (0.6%) Asian, 0 (0.0%) Pacific Islander, 19 (1.6%) from other races, and 28 (2.4%) from two or more races. Hispanic or Latino of any race were 84 persons (7.1%).

2000
As of the census of 2000, there were 1,208 people, 483 households, and 295 families residing in the county. The population density was 2 people per square mile (1/km2). There were 1,514 housing units at an average density of 2 per square mile (1/km2). The racial makeup of the county was 73.7% White, 0.6% Black or African American, 18.9% Native American, 0.3% Asian, 0.1% Pacific Islander, 1.4% from other races, and 5.1% from two or more races. 7.8% of the population were Hispanic or Latino of any race. 12.1% were of German, 12.1% Irish, 9.3% English, 6.5% American and 5.7% Italian ancestry. 95.0% spoke English, 3.1% Spanish and 2.0% Washo as their first language.

There were 483 households, out of which 25.5% had children under the age of 18 living with them, 43.9% were married couples living together, 11.0% had a female householder with no husband present, and 38.9% were non-families. 27.7% of all households were made up of individuals, and 5.4% had someone living alone who was 65 years of age or older. The average household size was 2.50 and the average family size was 2.96.

In the county, the population was spread out, with 22.8% under the age of 18, 10.4% from 18 to 24, 27.5% from 25 to 44, 29.3% from 45 to 64, and 9.9% who were 65 years of age or older. The median age was 39 years. For every 100 females there were 110.8 males. For every 100 females age 18 and over, there were 117.2 males.

The median income for a household in the county was $41,875, and the median income for a family was $50,250. Males had a median income of $36,544 versus $25,800 for females. The per capita income for the county was $24,431. About 12.0% of families and 19.5% of the population were below the poverty line, including 27.4% of those under age 18 and 10.1% of those age 65 or over.

Politics
Throughout the 20th century, Alpine County was a Republican stronghold in presidential and congressional elections. From 1892 until 2004, the only Democrat to carry Alpine County in a presidential election was Franklin Roosevelt in 1932 and 1936. In 1964, Alpine was one of only five counties in the state to back Barry Goldwater. It was among the five most Republican counties in the entire nation in 1892, 1908, 1920, and 1928. Warren Harding and Herbert Hoover gained over ninety percent of the county's vote. However, Alpine has become more of a Democratic county in recent elections. It was carried by John Kerry in 2004 and has stayed in the Democratic column since. No Republican has won a majority in the county since 1988.

  
  
  
  
  
  
  
  
  
  
  
  
  
  
  
  
  
  
  
  
  
  
  
  
  
  
  
  
  
  
  

In November 2008, Alpine was one of just three counties in California's interior in which voters rejected Proposition 8, the ballot initiative to amend the California Constitution to reject the legal extension of the title of marriage to same-sex couples. Alpine voters rejected Proposition 8 by 56.4 percent to 43.6 percent. The other interior counties in which Proposition 8 failed to receive a majority of votes were neighboring Mono and Yolo counties.

According to the California Secretary of State, there are 696 registered voters in Alpine County. Of those, 257 (36.9%) are registered Democratic, 210 (30.2%) are registered Republican, 46 (6.6%) are registered with other political parties, and 183 (26.3%) declined to state a political party.

Due to its low population density, Alpine County votes entirely by mail, one of two counties in California which do so. In the June 2014 primary elections, about 22% of registered voters statewide went to the polls; in Alpine County, the number was almost 70%, the highest of any county in the state.

Stonewall Nation
Gay activist Don Jackson seriously presented an idea for taking over Alpine County at a December 28, 1969 gay liberation conference in Berkeley, California. The project, which eventually became known as Stonewall Nation, was subsequently surreptitiously used by fellow gay activists Morris Kight and Don Kilhefner as an agitation and propaganda tool with no serious plans to bring the idea to fruition. Once the political theater aspect of the project was exposed, planning for the Alpine County project came to a halt even among demoralized true believers.

Posse Comitatus controversy
In the late 1970s, the Posse Comitatus organization attempted to take over Alpine County by settling there and fielding candidates in local elections. The Posse thought winning local elections in Alpine County was their best opportunity to take control of a single county. The group fielded a candidate for sheriff and registered fictitious voters using post office boxes and vacant lots as their addresses. Six people were prosecuted for voter fraud, the false registrations were thrown out, and the incumbent sheriff was re-elected.

Voter registration statistics

Transportation

Major highways
 State Route 4
 State Route 88
 State Route 89

Airport
The airport consists of a simple airstrip with an apron for small light aircraft to park. The airport has no buildings, no lights, and is rarely used. The airport is popular with astronomers due to the clear, dark skies.

Communities

All communities in Alpine County are unincorporated:

Alpine Village
Bear Valley
Fredericksburg
Kirkwood
Lake Alpine
Loope
Markleeville (county seat)
Mesa Vista
Paynesville
Sorensens
Woodfords

The only other counties in California with no incorporated cities are Mariposa and Trinity.

Population ranking
The population ranking of the following table is based on the 2020 census of Alpine County.

† county seat

See also 
Alpine County Unified School District
National Register of Historic Places listings in Alpine County, California
Stonewall Nation, a proposal by gay activists to colonize Alpine County in the 1970s
List of counties in California

Notes

References

External links

 

 
California counties
1864 establishments in California
Populated places established in 1864